Guishan Island / Gueishan Island or Steep Island or Turtle Island, also known as Kweishan Island or Kueishan Island, is an island in the Pacific Ocean, part of Toucheng Township, Yilan County, Taiwan and located  east of port of Kengfang Fishery Harbor. The island's name is derived from the resemblance of the topography of the island to that of a turtle. There is a smaller island south of Gueishan Island called Gueiluan Island) (Kweiluan Tao, Kiran-to;). The island is a dormant volcano that last erupted on 1785.

History

The local population, consisting mainly of fishermen, was relocated in 1977 due to the hardships associated with living on the island. Between 1977 and 2000 it became the site of a military base, and currently it is managed as a tourist destination and natural conservation area. There are restrictions for visitors due to environmental protection. In 2000, the island was officially opened to tourists as a maritime ecological park.

On May 13, 2016, President Ma Ying-jeou visited the island.

In December 2016 until February 2017, the island was closed for environmental protection reasons.

Geology 
The island is the top of an andesite stratovolcano which rises from the seafloor. It is the only active volcano in Taiwan, displaying active fumaroles and solfataras.

Ecology 
Endemic species of crab, Xenograpsus testudinatus feeds on sulfur and lives around underwater hot springs of the island. Surrounding waters support rich ecosystem that attracts the top predators of ocean; cetaceans. This allows whale watching as one of major attractions in local tourism, targeting mostly smaller toothed whales such as pygmy sperm whales, false killer whales, and dolphins while larger whales such as sperm whales and humpback may be observed less frequently.

Head Turning of the Turtle Mountain 
From different views at different locations of Yilan County, the shape of Gueishan Island is quite different. Also the shape of the turtle's head is different; from Northeast Coastal Areas of Toucheng Township such as Shihcheng and Dasi, the shape is close to the head of a turtle, while from Luodong and Wujie Townships, the shape is triangular. The reason for this is the curvy shape of the seashore of Yilan, circling the very island. There is hence the term "Head Turning of the Turtle Mountain" (龜山轉頭).

Visiting the island 
Before going to the island, visitor numbers have to be reviewed to see which day is available for registration.

The application must be completed and shipping agreed with local ferry owners at least one week prior to the visiting date, there is also another application form for going to the highest point of the island, which is often restricted.

See also
 Honeymoon Bay, Yilan
 List of volcanoes in Taiwan
 List of islands of Taiwan

References

External links 

 National Northeast Coastal Scenic Area -- Gueishan Island  

Islands of Taiwan
Volcanoes of Taiwan
Holocene stratovolcanoes
Landforms of Yilan County, Taiwan
Protected areas of Taiwan
Tourist attractions in Yilan County, Taiwan